Giacomo Venturoli (17th century) was an Italian mathematician.

Life 

Venturoli was a priest and taught arithmetic. He wrote mainly about accountancy, contributing to the definition and promotion of this newly established discipline. 
In his book Scorta di economia, he mentioned as references the works by Angelo Pietra and by Domenico Manzoni.

Works

References 

17th-century Italian mathematicians
17th-century Italian Roman Catholic priests
Catholic clergy scientists